Aliyar Ferzulakhovich Ismailov (born 11 April 1976) is a Russian professional football coach and a former player. He is an assistant coach with FC Anzhi Makhachkala.

Club career
He made his Russian Football National League debut for FC Anzhi Makhachkala on 6 September 1997 in a game against FC Lokomotiv Chita. He played 2 more seasons in the FNL for FC Dynamo Makhachkala.

External links
 
 
Profile on Inter Baku's Official Site

1976 births
People from Kaspiysk
Living people
Russian footballers
Association football defenders
Russian expatriate footballers
Expatriate footballers in Azerbaijan
FC Anzhi Makhachkala players
Qarabağ FK players
Shamakhi FK players
Turan-Tovuz IK players
Russian expatriate sportspeople in Azerbaijan
Azerbaijan Premier League players
FC Chita players
FC Dynamo Makhachkala players
Sportspeople from Dagestan